Robert Milton Boody (March 6, 1836 – October 22, 1913) was an American soldier who fought in the American Civil War. Boody received the country's highest award for bravery during combat, the Medal of Honor, for his action during the Battle of Williamsburg at Williamsburg, Virginia, and the Battle of Chancellorsville at Chancellorsville, Virginia, on May 5, 1862, and May 2, 1863. He was honored with the award on July 8, 1896.

Biography
Boody was born in Limington, Maine, on March 6, 1836. He joined the army from Amesbury, Massachusetts, in June 1861. It was while he was a sergeant in the 40th New York Infantry when he performed the two acts of gallantry for which he was awarded the Medal of Honor. He was commissioned as an officer in September 1863, and was mustered out in July 1864.

Boody died on October 22, 1913, and his remains are interred in the Greenwood Cemetery in Haverhill, Massachusetts.

Medal of Honor citation

See also

List of American Civil War Medal of Honor recipients: A–F

References

External links
 

1836 births
1913 deaths
People of Maine in the American Civil War
People of Massachusetts in the American Civil War
Union Navy officers
United States Army Medal of Honor recipients
American Civil War recipients of the Medal of Honor
People from Limington, Maine